The Université d'été de Boulogne-sur-Mer is a summer university at Boulogne-sur-Mer, Pas de Calais, France.

External links 
 Université d'été de Boulogne-sur-Mer official website

Educational institutions established in 1951
French-language education
1951 establishments in France